John Wallace (8 April 1654 – 11 July 1733) was a Roman Catholic bishop who served as the Coadjutor Vicar Apostolic of the Vicariate Apostolic of Scotland  and then of Lowland District, Scotland.

Life

Born in Arbroath, Forfarshire in 1654 and converted to the Catholic Church in 1690, he was ordained a priest on 3 April 1708. He was appointed the Coadjutor Vicariate Apostolic of Scotland and Titular Bishop of Cyrrhus by the Holy See on 30 April 1720. He was consecrated to the Episcopate on 21 September 1720. The principal consecrator was Bishop James Gordon. When on 23 July 1727 the Vicariate Apostolic of Scotland was split in two Vicariates Apostolic, Bishop Wallace continued to serve as the Coadjutor Viacar Apostolic of the Lowland District until his death on 11 July 1733.

See also

Catholic Church in Scotland

References

External links
Profile ar Gcatholic.org

1654 births
1733 deaths
Converts to Roman Catholicism
Apostolic vicars of Scotland
18th-century Roman Catholic bishops in Scotland
People from Arbroath